Gregory Thomas Murtha (born April 23, 1957) is a former American football tackle. He played for the Baltimore Colts in 1982 and for the New Jersey Generals from 1983 to 1984.

References

1957 births
Living people
Players of American football from Minneapolis
American football tackles
Minnesota Golden Gophers football players
Baltimore Colts players
New Jersey Generals players